"Used to Be" is a song by American dream pop band Beach House from their third studio album, Teen Dream. It was written by lead vocalist and keyboardist Victoria Legrand and guitarist Alex Scally and produced by them along with Chris Coady. The song was released on October 21, 2008 as the album's lead single and features a B-side of a different version of "Apple Orchard", a song which featured on their self-titled debut album.

The single version released in 2008 is included on the band's B-Sides and Rarities compilation album, released on June 30, 2017.

Background 
"Used to Be" was recorded by Rob Girardi in Baltimore in July 2008. The B-side "Apple Orchard" was recorded by the band in Baltimore in July 2005. The single features a front, back and inside cover arts, all three are Polaroids photographed by Legrand. The song is the first seven inch single released by the band. According to Carpark Records, the song was "recorded over the summer of 2008 after many exhaustive months of touring." The song contemplates the spiritual and physical effects of life on the ever-changing road, love and getting older. The B-side is a four-track demo version of "Apple Orchard", a song which featured on the band's self-titled debut, recorded three years to the month before "Used to Be". It is one of the first things Scally and Legrand recorded together as Beach House.

Composition 
Sputnikmusic described "Used to Be" as a "jazzy hop-step," as well as stating it is "easily the record’s most upbeat song." Consequence of Sound said the song doesn't "only open with the sound of the drum machine, but use speed increases of the percussion to move the songs past the down-tempo slow jams Beach House usually seem stuck on." PopMatters said the song is "a revelation at the album’s halfway point. Legrand sings along to the piano melody, and the mix surrounds the listener with multitracked vocals and percussion. Although the instruments are competing for space, the song does not feel overcrowded. The best development within the song is a drum shuffle that emerges from the quarter notes that have been steadily marking the tempo."

Critical reception 
Pretty Much Amazing called the song a "notable standout" off the album. American Songwriter said "Used to Be" is "a rollicking dreamboat; if ever there were a tune to listen to while coasting along in a Cadillac convertible, this is it." DIY said the song features "one of the loveliest fade-outs in recent memory." The 405 said the song "builds to a quiet crescendo of noise that is capped with some heartbreaking and mezmerising vocals," while also including it on the best "track to download" off the album along with "Norway." musicOMH said the track is given "extra dimensions with sonic architecture, intricate guitar picking, and Victoria Legrand’s surprisingly meaty vocals." Now Magazine says the songs effectively places "lyrical peaks into the slow-tempo slurry of basic backbeats and electronic clouds," while labeling it as the top track off the album. Sputnikmusic praised Legrand's vocal performance on the song, stating it is perhaps her strongest one.

Music video 
The music video for "Used to Be" was directed by Matt Amato. It was uploaded to Carpark Records' YouTube channel on November 19, 2008.

Track listings 
 Digital download
 "Used to Be" (single version) (4:05)
 "Apple Orchard" (Virgin 4 Track Recording) (4:06)
 UK CD single
 "Used to Be" (single version) (3:57)
 "Apple Orchard" (Virgin 4 Track Recording) (4:04)
 US 7" single
Side A
 "Used to Be" (single version) (3:57)
Side B
 "Apple Orchard" (Virgin 4 Track Recording) (4:04)

Personnel
Beach House
 Beach House – production, composition, arrangement
 Alex Scally – guitar, bass, organ, piano, background vocals
 Victoria Legrand – vocals, keyboards, organ, bells
Additional
 Chris Coady – production, engineering, mixing
 Dan Franz – drums
 Graham Hill – percussion
 Alan Douches – mastering
 Rob Girardi – recording

References

2008 singles
2008 songs
Sub Pop singles
Beach House songs
Songs written by Victoria Legrand